Tami Sawyer (born April 27, 1982) is an American politician and civil rights activist. She was elected in August 2018 as Shelby County Commissioner for District 7 and resides in Memphis, Tennessee. She is a member of the Democratic Party. She serves as chair of the Education and Legislative committees. She is chair of the Shelby County Commission Black Caucus.

Sawyer has provided commentary on social justice and public policy for many outlets including Al Jazeera, CNN, Commercial Appeal, Essence, Forbes, HuffPost, MLK50, MSNBC, NPR, Roland Martin, and Time. In 2020, We Can't Wait, a documentary chronicling her 2019 mayoral campaign, was named Best Hometowner Feature at the Indie Memphis Film Festival. Sawyer is featured in the award-winning 2022 documentary, Who We Are: A Chronicle of Racism in America with Jeffery Robinson.

Sawyer is a member of Alpha Kappa Alpha sorority and the Links, Inc., social organizations for Black women.

Early life and education 
Sawyer was born in Evanston, Illinois, to Gladys and Andrew Sawyer, Jr. She has one older brother, Michael. At the age of 8, her family relocated to South Holland, Illinois. When Sawyer was 12, her parents returned to her mother's home state, Tennessee. The Sawyer family resided in Mason, Tennessee, and she attended St. Mary's Episcopal School for middle school and high school. Upon graduation from high school in 2000, Sawyer attended Hampton University. She subsequently graduated from the University of Memphis in 2004 with a BA in Political Science. Sawyer then attended Howard University School of Law for two years before leaving to explore career opportunities. As of 2020, Sawyer is a graduate student at the University of Memphis seeking a master's degree in rhetorical communications.

Career 
From 2008 to 2014, Sawyer was a human capital analyst supporting diversity initiatives at NAVSEA PEO IWS, a program office of the United States Navy. During that time, she competed on the Food Network's Cupcake Wars and owned a small cupcake business, TamiCakes.

Having lived in Washington, DC for a decade, she returned home to Memphis and led a team in teacher licensing for Shelby County Schools.

In 2015, Sawyer began a five year tenure with Teach for America Memphis as the Managing Director, Diversity and Community Partnerships.

Following her employment with Teach for America, Sawyer held leadership positions with Black Voters Matter and Our Black Party.

Sawyer serves on the board of Common Cause and is co-chair of the Memphis NAACP Legal Defense Fund.

Activism and #TakeEmDown901 
Following the trial of George Zimmerman for the killing of Trayvon Martin, and the domestic attack on the Washington Navy Yard in 2013, Sawyer became engaged in social justice and political activism. In 2014, she organized her first protest at the National Civil Rights Museum in the wake of the decision by a St. Louis grand jury not to try Darren Wilson for the killing of Michael Brown. Sawyer became known as a leader and voice of the burgeoning Black Lives Matter movement in Memphis.

Sawyer organized a vigil in December 2015 after a Cleveland prosecutor declined charging the police officers who shot and killed Tamir Rice. The vigil was held in Health Sciences Park in front of the statue of Confederate General and Ku Klux Klan Grand Wizard, Nathan Bedford Forrest. Two years later, the City of Memphis removed both the Forrest statue and a statue of Jefferson Davis, president of the Confederacy, after responding to pressure from the #TakeEmDown901 movement which Sawyer formed and led.

After being elected to office in 2018, Sawyer continued her activism. She was a participant and organizer in the 2020 George Floyd protests in Memphis. In 2021, Sawyer was arrested outside of the White House with several other activists while protesting for an end to the filibuster and protection of voting rights.

Political campaigns 

 2016 Tennessee State Representative, District 90
 Sawyer lost the Democratic Primary to incumbent John DeBerry, Jr. DeBerry (56.67%) - Sawyer (43.37%). 
 2018 Shelby County Commissioner, District 7
 Sawyer won the Democratic Primary with 50.3% over two opponents.
 Sawyer defeated Republican Sam Goff in the general election. Sawyer (80.5%) - Goff (19.4%).
 2019 Memphis Mayor
 Sawyer was an unsuccessful challenger to incumbent Jim Strickland. She finished 3rd of 11 candidates and garnered 6.9% of the vote.
 Sawyer's term as Commissioner ends on August 31, 2022. She announced that she will not run for re-election but plans to begin a Ph.D. program in public policy.

Awards and recognition 

 Ebony Power 100 List 2018
 Memphis Business Journal Top 40 under 40 Class of 2018
 The Tennessean's 18 Tennesseans to Watch in 2018
 Reckon South's 2022 Reckon List
 Women of Achievement Heroism Award 2018

References 

Tennessee local politicians
American activists
Politicians from Memphis, Tennessee
21st-century African-American politicians
21st-century American politicians
African-American activists
1982 births
Living people
Tennessee Democrats
Women in Tennessee politics
University of Memphis alumni